Vølstad Church is a parish church of the Church of Norway in Nordre Land Municipality in Innlandet county, Norway. It is located in the village of Vølstad. It is one of the churches for the Østsinni parish which is part of the Hadeland og Land prosti (deanery) in the Diocese of Hamar. The brown, wooden church was built in a long church design in 1959 using plans drawn up by the architect Per Nordan. The church seats about 140 people.

History
During the 1950s, plans were made to build a church in Vølstad. Per Nordan (the grandson of the noted church architect Jacob Wilhelm Nordan) was hired to design the new church. It was a wooden long church that was constructed during 1959. The new church was consecrated on 24 June 1959 (on the Nativity of Saint John the Baptist day).

See also
List of churches in Hamar

References

Nordre Land
Churches in Innlandet
Long churches in Norway
Wooden churches in Norway
20th-century Church of Norway church buildings
Churches completed in 1959
1959 establishments in Norway